A crime laboratory, often shortened to crime lab, is a scientific laboratory, using primarily forensic science for the purpose of examining evidence from criminal cases.

Lab personnel 

A typical crime lab has two sets of personnel:
Field analysts – investigators that go to crime scenes, collect evidence, and process the scene. Job titles include:
Forensic evidence technician
Crime scene investigator
Scenes of crime officer (SOCO)
Laboratory analysts – scientists or other personnel who run tests on the evidence once it is brought to the lab (i.e., DNA tests, or bullet striations). Job titles include:
Forensic Technician (performs support functions such as making reagents)
Forensic Scientist/Criminalist (performs scientific analyses on evidence)
Fingerprint Analyst
Forensic Photographer
Forensic Document Examiner
Forensic Entomologist

Crime labs

United States
In the United States, crime labs may be publicly or privately operated, although private laboratories typically do not respond to crime scenes to collect evidence.  Public crime labs are organized at the city, state, or national level.  A law enforcement agency that operates its own crime lab usually has access to a higher level laboratory for analysis of their evidence.  Most states have their own crime labs, for instance Oklahoma has the OSBI, many other places have smaller yet sufficient crime labs. Crime labs simply do not have the funding or personnel resources to keep up with the large influx of cases being brought into the laboratory, as well as the backlog of cases already in existence.

The Los Angeles Police Department founded the first crime laboratory in the United States (1923), followed by the Bureau of Investigation (1926), forerunner to the Federal Bureau of Investigation.  (Every Contact Leaves a Trace, Connie Fletcher, St. Martin's Press, New York, 2009, interview with crime lab director)

Crime labs in popular culture
The term "crime lab" has become a part of popular culture, largely due to the TV dramas. Some of the more famous shows are:
Bones (TV series)
"Castle (TV series)"
CSI: Crime Scene Investigation and spin-offs CSI: Miami and CSI: NY
NCIS
Quincy, M.E. – a 1970s television show featuring crime lab personnel and procedures.

Several non-fiction television programs, document the resolution of criminal cases based on the scientific analysis of the evidence:
Forensic Files

Backlogged evidence issues
Due to the lack of funding and staff, delays in the ability to test cases has occurred creating a backlog in the analysis of evidence.

See also
 Combined DNA Index System

References

External links
FBI Crime Lab
Arkansas State Crime Lab
Census of Publicly Funded Forensic Crime Laboratories Bureau of Justice Statistics
Forensic Science Laboratories: Handbook for Facility Planning, Design, Construction, and Relocation National Institute of Standards and Technology
US Postal Inspection Service Forensic Lab
Reddy's Forensic Page - link to US and international forensic laboratories

Forensic facilities